Tom Vangeneugden (born 31 January 1983) is a Belgian swimmer.

He was born in Overpelt and currently resides in Overijse. He holds the 800m, 1500m and 4x200 freestyle long course national records.

External links
 Personal website

Belgian male freestyle swimmers
Belgian male long-distance swimmers
Olympic swimmers of Belgium
Swimmers at the 2008 Summer Olympics
1983 births
Living people
Sportspeople from Limburg (Belgium)
People from Overpelt